MPEG-4 Audio Lossless Coding, also known as MPEG-4 ALS, is an extension to the MPEG-4 Part 3 audio standard to allow lossless audio compression. The extension was finalized in December 2005 and published as ISO/IEC 14496-3:2005/Amd 2:2006 in 2006. The latest description of MPEG-4 ALS was published as subpart 11 of the MPEG-4 Audio standard (ISO/IEC 14496-3:2019) (5th edition) in December 2019.

MPEG-4 ALS combines a short-term predictor and a long term predictor. The short-term predictor is similar to FLAC in its operation - it is a quantized LPC predictor with a losslessly coded residual using Golomb Rice Coding or Block Gilbert Moore Coding (BGMC). The long term predictor is modeled by 5 long-term weighted residues, each with its own lag (delay). The lag can be hundreds of samples. This predictor improves the compression for sounds with rich harmonics (containing multiples of a single fundamental frequency, locked in phase) present in many musical instruments and human voice.

Features 
 Support for PCM resolutions of up to 32-bit including floating-point
 Arbitrary sampling rates
 Multi-channel / multi-track support (up to 65536 channels)
 Streaming
 Seekable (fast random access to any part of the encoded data). 
 Optional storage in MP4 file format; can be multiplexed with video and other media content supported by the MP4 container. 
 An MPEG-4 Audio profile "ALS Simple Profile", invoked with "-sp1" in the reference encoder.

Software support 
, there has not been wide acceptance of this format, possibly due to the lack of encoders and decoders available.

A reference implementation of MPEG-4 ALS encoder and decoder (mp4als - e.g. mp4alsRM23) can be obtained at the MPEG-4 ALS homepage and it was also published as ISO/IEC 14496-5:2001/Amd 10:2007/Cor 3:2009.

There is a MPEG-4 ALS Decoder plugin for Winamp player.

On November 11, 2009, the FFmpeg open source project gained an MPEG-4 ALS decoder in its development version. Only a subset of the format is currently supported.

History 
In July 2002, the Moving Picture Experts Group issued a call for proposals of lossless audio coding procedures to be sent in before December. Seven companies submitted their proposals which were examined taking into consideration compression efficiency, complexity and flexibility. By July 2003, Lossless Predictive Audio Compression (LPAC) was selected as the first draft for the future standard. The reference model was further developed under participation of the Technical University of Berlin (TUB), RealNetworks, and Nippon Telegraph and Telephone (NTT).

See also 
 Lossless Predictive Audio Compression (predecessor)
 Lossless Transform Audio Compression (pre-predecessor)
 MPEG-4 SLS (MPEG-4 Scalable Lossless Coding)
 MPEG-4

References

External links 
 MPEG-4 ALS homepage - Technical University of Berlin
 MPEG-4 Audio Lossless Coding (ALS) - MultimediaWiki
 MPEG-4 ALS: Performance, Applications, and Related Standardization Activities - NTT (2007)
 Technical papers describing design of residual coding and quantization algorithms in MPEG-4 ALS codec
 Announcement on ACN Newswire
 Technical specifications (ISO/IEC 14496-3:2005/Amd 2:2006) (not free)
 Official MPEG web site

MPEG-4
Lossless audio codecs